Milwaukee Deep, also known as the Milwaukee Depth, is part of the Puerto Rico Trench. Together with the surrounding area, known as Brownson Deep, the Milwaukee Deep forms an elongated depression that constitutes the floor of the trench. As there is no geomorphological distinction between the two, it has been proposed that the use of both names to refer to distinct areas should be reviewed.

The floor of the Puerto Rico Trench constitutes the deepest point in the Atlantic Ocean. During the Five Deeps Expedition, explorer Victor Vescovo achieved the first crewed descent to this location. Media outlets overwhelmingly referred to the area as the Brownson Deep, while the name Milwaukee Deep was used by others. However, likely due to the factors mentioned above, the expedition has not used any particular name to refer to the site of their Atlantic dive. It is named for the USS Milwaukee (CL-5) which was itself named for the city of Milwaukee.

History 
By then, the existence of deep water to the Atlantic Ocean side of the Caribbean had been known for more than a century.

Crewed descents 

In 1964, the French submersible Archimède explored the Puerto Rico Trench to a depth of approximately  but did not reach its deepest point.

This made the Limiting Factor the deepest diving operational submersible at the time.

See also

List of submarine topographical features
Oceanic trench
Challenger Deep

References

Lowest points of the World Ocean
Oceanic trenches of the Atlantic Ocean
Physical oceanography